The 1996 Tour de France was the 83rd edition of Tour de France, one of cycling's Grand Tours. The Tour began in 's-Hertogenbosch in the Netherlands with a prologue individual time trial on 29 June and Stage 10 occurred on 9 July with a hilly stage to Gap. The race finished on the Champs-Élysées in Paris on 21 July.

Prologue
29 June 1996 — 's-Hertogenbosch (Netherlands),  (ITT)

Stage 1
30 June 1996 — 's-Hertogenbosch (Netherlands),

Stage 2
1 July 1996 — 's-Hertogenbosch (Netherlands) to Wasquehal,

Stage 3
2 July 1996 — Wasquehal to Nogent-sur-Oise,

Stage 4
3 July 1996 — Soissons to Lac de Madine,

Stage 5
4 July 1996 — Lac de Madine to Besançon,

Stage 6
5 July 1996 — Arc-et-Senans to Aix-les-Bains,

Stage 7
6 July 1996 — Chambéry to Les Arcs,

Stage 8
7 July 1996 — Bourg-Saint-Maurice to Val d'Isère,  (ITT)

Stage 9
8 July 1996 — Le Monêtier-les-Bains to Sestriere (Italy), 

This stage was shortened due to bad weather.

Stage 10
9 July 1996 — Turin (Italy) to Gap,

References

1996 Tour de France
Tour de France stages